Microbacterium insulae is a Gram-positive and non-motile bacterium from the genus Microbacterium which has been isolated from soil from Dokdo, Korea.

References

External links
Type strain of Microbacterium insulae at BacDive -  the Bacterial Diversity Metadatabase	

Bacteria described in 2009
insulae